"The Bigger Picture" is a protest song by American rapper Lil Baby. It was released on June 12, 2020, in the wake of the murder of George Floyd. In the song, Lil Baby shows solidarity with the 2020 Black Lives Matter protests calling for justice against police brutality in the United States and systemic racism. Proceeds from "The Bigger Picture" benefit The National Association of Black Journalists, Breonna Taylor's attorney, The Bail Project, and Black Lives Matter.

It is Lil Baby's highest-charting song as a lead artist on the Billboard Hot 100, debuting and peaking at number three, behind "Trollz" by 6ix9ine & Nicki Minaj and "Rockstar" by DaBaby & Roddy Ricch. It was later added to the deluxe edition of his second studio album My Turn. The song received two nominations at the 63rd Annual Grammy Awards: Best Rap Performance and Best Rap Song.

Background
Prior to the song's release, Lil Baby was seen marching down Mitchell Street in his hometown Atlanta, during the George Floyd protests in Georgia. He was accompanied by the city's Councilman Antonio Brown.

Composition and lyrics
The song was written by Lil Baby, alongside its producers, Section 8, (who also produced Lil Baby's "We Paid") and Noah Pettigrew. It begins with morose keys, a soundbite taken from the news George Norsman the George Floyd protest in Minneapolis, and chants from Black Lives Matter protesters, chanting "I can't breathe". Lil Baby then starts rapping, venting over a hard, clicking drum clap and a dramatic and "haunting" piano riff. Riley Runnels of Paper noted "The chorus dictates what protestors are fighting for is 'bigger than Black and White'. It's deep-rooted, it's systemic and it's going to require a lot of time to change". However, Lil Baby continues with optimism, rapping "But we gotta start somewhere". With the line, "Corrupted police been the problem where I'm from, but I'd be lying if I said it was all of them", Lil Baby references the heated sentiment that all police officers are racist oppressors ("All Cops Are Bad" or A.C.A.B.). 
Charles Holmes of Rolling Stone summarized the song and its concept:

Critical reception
"The Bigger Picture" received critical acclaim. Riley Wallace of HipHopDX called the song and video "amazing" and appraised it as "a protest anthem that manages to strike even more poignantly by not inherently branding itself as such". Riley concluded that Lil Baby seamlessly articulates "the frustration, confusion, and innate call to stand up for something much bigger than himself". Miki Hellerbach of Euphoria magazine opined that "while Kendrick Lamar's voice was the sound of the Mike Brown/Eric Garner/Freddie Gray protests with his song 'Alright', it seems clear why Lil Baby is the sound of now". Hellerbach stated Lil Baby seems to center and ignite the listener simultaneously, and "in the hook, he raps poignantly through his vulnerability and motivation": "It's a problem with the whole way of life/ It can't change overnight, but we gotta start somewhere/ Might as well gone 'head start here".

In a highly positive review, Charles Holmes of Rolling Stone said "The Bigger Picture" "isn't a protest song, it's a song shaped by protest", praising Lil Baby's storytelling skills: "Baby's main talent has always been his avoidance of obfuscation in favor of a direct address". Tom Breihan of Stereogum deemed it "a stirring and ultimately optimistic song", and said he "honestly found it pretty moving". Billboards Jason Lipshutz deemed it "the biggest modern protest song".

Cover art
The song's cover art is a picture taken at a George Floyd protest in Atlanta on June 8, 2020, where Lil Baby led a crowd on a bicycle. The photo was taken by photographer Matthew Geovany

Commercial performance
On its first day of release, "The Bigger Picture" reached number-one on both the US and global Apple Music charts, while reaching number three on US Spotify. "The Bigger Picture" debuted at number three on the US Billboard Hot 100, becoming Lil Baby's highest-charting song as a lead artist, surpassing "Drip Too Hard", which peaked at number four in 2018.

Music video
The video was released on the same day as the song and takes place at the Black Lives Matter protest in Lil Baby's hometown of Atlanta. The video shows Lil Baby standing among other protesters, raising his hand in solidarity and wearing a Black Lives Matter t-shirt. It also features footage of the nationwide protests from the previous two weeks that followed the murder of George Floyd, an African American man murdered by a police officer.

Charts

Weekly charts

Year-end charts

Certifications

See also
 "Otherside of America", a song by Meek Mill, also released in June 2020, and associated with Black Lives Matter and George Floyd

References

2020 singles
2020 songs
Lil Baby songs
Songs written by Lil Baby
Songs written by Section 8 (record producer)
Song recordings produced by Section 8 (record producer)
Protest songs
Black Lives Matter art
Songs about police brutality
Political rap songs
Universal Music Group singles